Kelly Lee Curtis (born June 17, 1956) is an American actress. She is known for her roles in  Magic Sticks (1987), and The Devil's Daughter (1991).

Early life
Kelly Curtis was born in Santa Monica, California, the older child of actors Tony Curtis and Janet Leigh. Her sister is actress Jamie Lee Curtis. Her paternal grandparents were Hungarian-Jewish immigrants and two of her maternal great-grandparents were Danish. The rest of her mother’s ancestry is German and Scots-Irish. She has four half-siblings, from her father's remarriages, Alexandra Curtis; Allegra Curtis; Nicholas Curtis, who died of a drug overdose; and Benjamin Curtis. 

Curtis' first appearance on the silver screen was as a young girl in the United Artists action/adventure The Vikings (1958) starring her parents, as well as Kirk Douglas and Ernest Borgnine. Her parents divorced in 1962, after which her mother married Robert Brandt. 

In 1978, she graduated from Skidmore College in Saratoga Springs, New York, with a degree in Business. She worked briefly as a stockbroker.

Career
Curtis studied acting at the Lee Strasberg Theatre Institute. An article in the Los Angeles Times of July 28, 1982, about the play Say Goodnight, Gracie reads, in part, "Kelly Curtis is Ginny, sadly resigned to not being smart but smartly settled for honest responses. Here, writing and performance transcend one-note designation. Seated quietly, Curtis delivers a touching monologue that would have been the heart of another and better play, rather than a disarming moment of inspired simplicity." She played the role as Shirley in the comedy Magic Sticks (1987) opposite George Kranz, and starred in the leading role as Miriam Kreisl in the horror film The Devil's Daughter (1991).

On September 14, 1989, she and playwright/producer Scott Morfee (born 1954) were married. The couple were then working together on his play with music, Shout and Twist, which she was not only appearing in, but producing.

Curtis was a regular cast member in the role as Lieutenant Carolyn Plummer during the first season of the crime/action television series The Sentinel (1996) opposite co-stars Richard Burgi, Garett Maggart, and Bruce A. Young. Her guest appearances on TV include roles on The Renegades (1983), Star Trek: Deep Space Nine (1993), and Judging Amy (1999). She has worked as an assistant on such films as Freaky Friday (2003), Christmas with the Kranks (2004), and You Again (2010).

As of 1990, Curtis and her husband have lived in New York on Long Island.

Filmography
The Vikings (1958) as young girl (uncredited)
Trading Places (1983) as Muffy
Magic Sticks (1987) as Shirley
Checkpoint (1987) as Joyce
The Devil's Daughter (1991) as Miriam Kreisl (starring role)
Ex-Cop (1992) as Officer
Mixed Blessings (1998) as Annie Weaver
June (1998) (short film)

Production crew
Freaky Friday (2003), assistant
Christmas with the Kranks (2004), assistant
You Again (2010), assistant

Television films
Kojak: Ariana (1989) as Whitley
Thanksgiving Day (1990) as Barbara Schloss
False Arrest (1991) as Mary Durand
Search and Rescue (1994)

Series television
The Renegades episode: Target: Marciano (1983) as Cynthia Holtson
The Equalizer episode: No Conscience (1986) as Vicki; episode: No Place Like Home (1988) as Paula Whitaker
Hunter episode: The Reporter (1991) as Amy Rivers
Silk Stalkings episode: Curtain Call (1992) as Sara Lawton
Star Trek: Deep Space Nine episode: Captive Pursuit (1993) as Miss Sarda
The Sentinel (1996) as Lt. Carolyn Plummer
LateLine episode: Karp's Night Out (1999) as Shelly
Judging Amy episode: Last Tango in Hartford (1999) as Leslie Wirth

References

External links

Stockton honors legend Janet Leigh with plaza Jamie Lee and Kelly, retrieved 5/17/09
"F is for ... Fealty,' Image of Kelly with her sister Jamie Lee in 2008, Time Magazine
Janet Leigh and Kelly Curtis at It Runs in the Family film premiere

20th-century American actresses
Living people
1956 births
Actresses from Santa Monica, California
American film actresses
American people of German descent
American people of Hungarian-Jewish descent
American people of Danish descent
American people of Scotch-Irish descent
American television actresses
Lee Strasberg Theatre and Film Institute alumni
Skidmore College alumni
21st-century American women
Year of birth missing (living people)